also known by his Chinese style name , was a prince of Ryukyu Kingdom.

Prince Ōzato was the third son of King Shō Kō, and was a half-brother of King Shō Iku. He was given Ōzato magiri (mordern part of Nanjō), and established a new royal family: Ōzato Udun.

He served as sessei from 1852 to 1861. In 1859, Makishi Chōchū, Onga Chōkō, Oroku Ryōchū and Prince Tamagawa Chōtatsu were involved in illegal matter (Makishi Onga Incident), and Prince Ie Chōchoku was appointed as judge to interrogate them. Prince Ōzato supported Prince Ie to convict them. 

After this incident, Prince Ōzato retired in 1861. His position turned to Yonagusuku Chōki.

References

|-

1816 births
Princes of Ryūkyū
Sessei
People of the Ryukyu Kingdom
Ryukyuan people
19th-century Ryukyuan people
Year of death missing